Millham was a township that existed in Mercer County, New Jersey, United States, from 1882 to 1888.

Millham was incorporated as a township by an Act of the New Jersey Legislature on February 10, 1882, from portions of Lawrence Township. On March 30, 1888, the township was annexed by Trenton. The Top Road and East Trenton sections of the city represent the former township.

References

1882 establishments in New Jersey
1888 disestablishments in New Jersey
Former municipalities in Mercer County, New Jersey
Former townships in New Jersey
Populated places established in 1882